Tirumular (also spelt Thirumoolar etc., originally known as Suntaranāthar) was a Tamil Shaivite mystic and writer, considered one of the sixty-three Nayanmars and one of the 18 Siddhars. His main work, the Tirumantiram (also sometimes written Tirumanthiram, Tirumandhiram, etc.), which consists of over 3000 verses, forms a part of the key text of the Tamil Shaiva Siddhanta, the Tirumurai.

Chronology 
The dates of Tirumular's life are controversial, and because his work makes reference to so many currents of religious thought, the dates that different scholars assign are often appealed to for anchoring the relative chronology of other literature in Tamil and Sanskrit. Verse 74 of the Tirumantiram makes the claim that Tirumular lived for 7 yugams before composing the Tirumantiram.

Some are therefore inclined to place his composition well before the Common Era. The scholar and lexicographer S. Vaiyapuripillai, however, suggested that he probably belonged to the beginning of the eighth-century CE, pointing out that Tirumular could not very well be placed earlier given that he appears to refer to the Tevaram hymns of Sambandar, Appar and Sundarar, that he used "very late words" and that he made mention of the weekdays.
 	
Others wish to push the date still later: Dominic Goodall, for instance, appears to suggest, on the grounds of religious notions that appear in the work with Sanskrit labels for which a certain historical development can be traced in other datable works, that the Tirumantiram cannot be placed before the 11th- or 12th-century CED. Yet another view, alluded to for instance by Vaiyapuripillai (ibid.), is that the text may contain an ancient core, but with "a good number of interpolated stanzas" of later date. Whatever the case, allusions to works and ideas in the Tirumantiram cannot, at least for the moment, be used as useful indicators of their chronology.

History 
Sundara Nathar, as the saint is known, was a Yogi originally from then Madurai (currently South madurai - Tamil Nadu) who travelled to Mount Kailaayam (Mount Kailash) and was initiated directly by Lord Sivan (Lord Shiva). After spending 5 years at Mount Kailaayam, he undertook a journey under the order of Sivan to Thamizhakam (Tamil homeland - ancient Tamil Nadu) to meet his contemporary sage friend Sage Agathiyar in Pothigai Hills (Pothiya Malai of ancient Tamil land) and after meeting Agathiyar he went to Chidambaram, and after worshiping Lord Natarajar at the Nataraja Temple, he was about to return to Kailaayam, and  while on his way, near Sathanur village (a village near Aaduthurai of Cauveri Delta area), he saw a group of cows crying. He went near the cows to discover that their cowherd, Moolan, was dead, having been bitten by a snake. He was very touched by the sight of the cows that he wept in sorrow and decided to use his Oham (yogic power) and move his soul from his body to that of the dead cowherd's, leaving his own body inside a tree log. On waking up in the body of the cowherd, the cows became happy; then he navigated them to the village. He then returned to the place where he left his body, to return to his own body. To his surprise, his actual body had disappeared from the tree log, and was nowhere to be found. At this moment, he heard a divine voice from the sky (Lord Sivan) who told him that he was the one who made his body to disappear. Lord Sivan told him he did that because Lord Sivan wanted Sundara Nathar to spread his teachings through the body of Moolan; this way, every common person would get enlightened through the knowledge spread in Moolan's body, because of the simple dialect of a cowherd man using the Tamil Language compared to Sundara Nathar's own body which would have used an advanced and literary version of the Tamil language that would make it very difficult for the common people to understand and comprehend. Thus, from that day onwards he was known by the name of Thirumoolar (from Moolar, the name of the cowherd; the prefix Thiru means 'respected'). He was deeply immersed in thapam (meditation) under a peepul tree in Thiruvavaduthurai and received holy hymns in Tamil. Three thousand holy hymns have been documented in the book called Tirumantiram. The exact years of these events are unknown.

See also 
 Agastya
 Kalangi Nathar
 Bogar
 Patanjali
 Thirumandhiram

References

External links 

 Thirumanthiram with Tamil explanation — Tamil version of Thirumanthiram
 Tirumantiram — English version of Thirumanthiram

Nayanars
Indian Shaivite religious leaders
Hindu philosophers and theologians
Indian yogis
Indian Hindu saints